Ectopsocus richardsi is a species of outer barklouse in the family Ectopsocidae. It is found in Africa, Australia, Europe and Northern Asia (excluding China), Central America, North America, Oceania, South America, and Southern Asia.

References

Further reading

 
 
 

Ectopsocidae
Articles created by Qbugbot
Insects described in 1929